The Marvel Track Cup 2017 Yongchuan International Tournament was the third edition of the Yongchuan International Tournament, an invitational women's football tournament held in Yongchuan District, Chongqing, China.

Participants
In September 2017, the participants were announced.

Venues

Standings

Match results
All times are local, CST (UTC+8).

Statistic

References 

2017 in women's association football
2017
2017 in Chinese football
October 2017 sports events in China
2017 in Chinese women's sport